Nossa Senhora das Dores is Portuguese for Our Lady of Sorrows, a title of Mary.

It may also refer to the following places, named in her honor :

Brazil 
 Nossa Senhora das Dores, Santa Maria
 Nossa Senhora das Dores, Sergipe

Cape Verde
 Nossa Senhora das Dores (Sal), the sole freguesia (civil parish) of Sal, Cape Verde (municipality), which also covers the whole island.

See also 
 Senhora das Dores Church